"Éblouie par la nuit" is a song by French singer Zaz, written by Raphaël. She included it on her first studio album, Zaz (2010), and in November 2011 released it as the fourth and final single from the album. The music video was released on 17 November 2011.

Track listing 
Promo digital single – Play On (Sony)
 "Éblouie par la nuit" (2:53)

Cover versions 
The future Kids United member Erza Muqoli performed the song in the 20 January 2015 semi-final of the ninth season of La France a un incroyable talent, provoking a standing ovation from the audience.

Kids United later covered it on their first album, Un monde meilleur (2016).

Charts

References 

2010 songs
2011 singles
Zaz (singer) songs
Kids United songs
French songs
Sony Music singles